Paula DePriest is an American lichenologist and specialist in artefact conservation. She has been curator of the lichen collection at the National Museum of Natural History, USA and Deputy Director of the Smithsonian’s Museum Conservation Institute.

Early life and education
Paula Teresa DePriest studied at Union University, completing her bachelor degree in 1998 and then moved to the University of Tennessee for a Masters degree in botany in 1983. She undertook doctoral research at Duke University and was awarded PhD in 1992.

Career
She initially worked at the National Museum of Natural History in Washington, USA and was appointed the curator of the lichen collection. Later in her career she was scientific advisor in the Office of the Under Secretary for Science at the Smithsonian Institution and then Deputy Director of the Smithsonian’s Museum Conservation Institute. She has also held posts as Adjunct Professor at Duke University (1997-2004) and George Mason University (1998-2004).

Her research focuses on lichens, particularly the phylogenetic and cultural relationships of those used as forage in reindeer herding regions of Mongolia, the Cladoniaceae. She also studies the deterioration of outdoor sculpture and monuments that can be caused by fungi and lichens and has worked in a project about deer stones in collaboration with the Mongolian Academy of Sciences. Her work has identified or clarified the status of several lichens, including Flavoparmelia leucoxantha, Hypotrachyna quaesita, Punctelia dictyoidea and Punctelia roystoneae.

Publications
DePriest is the author or co-author of over 90 scientific publications and book chapters. The most significant include:
 Weaver, Jamie L., DePriest, Paula T., Plymale, Andrew E., Pearce, Carolyn I., Arey, Bruce, and Koestler, Robert J. 2021. Microbial interactions with silicate glasses. npj Materials Degradation 5:Article 11.
 DePriest, Paula T., Fitxzhugh, William W., Beaubien, Harriet F., and Bayarsaikhan, Jamsranjav. 2014. Research and Preservation of Mongolia's Cultural Heritage. Arctic Studies Center Newsletter (21): 14-17.
 Solazzo, Caroline, Heald, Susan, Ballard, Mary W., Ashford, David A., DePriest, Paula T., Koestler, Robert J., and Collins, Matthew. 2011. Proteomics and Coast Salish blankets: a tale of shaggy dogs? Antiquity 85:1418-1432.
 Ahti, T. & DePriest, P.T. 2001. New combinations of Cladina epithets in Cladonia (Ascomycotina: Parmeliaceae). Mycotaxon 78:499–502.

References

1957 births
American lichenologists
Duke University alumni
Smithsonian Institution people
American mycologists
Living people
Women lichenologists
Women mycologists